Lee Min-a (born 8 November 1991) is a South Korean footballer who plays as a midfielder for WK League club Incheon Hyundai Steel Red Angels and the South Korea national team.

Club career

Incheon Hyundai Steel Red Angels 

After playing for Yeungjin College from 2010 to 2012, Lee joined Incheon Hyundai Steel Red Angels in the WK League. In 2015, she scored 6 goals and recorded 5 assists in 26 appearances. In 2016, she scored 7 goals and provided 1 assist in 23 appearances. In 2017, she finished the season with 14 goals and 10 assists in 28 appearances. Between 2013 and 2017, Lee won 5 straight WK League titles.

INAC Kobe Leonessa 

In December 2017, Lee joined Nadeshiko League club INAC Kobe Leonessa. On 21 March 2018, she made her debut in a 2–0 home victory against Nippon Sport Science University Fields Yokohama. On 24 September 2018, she scored a brace in a 5–1 win over Mynavi Vegalta Sendai.

International career
Lee was part of the under-20 team that finished in third place at the 2010 FIFA U-20 Women's World Cup. On 15 February 2012, she made her senior debut for South Korea in a 1–0 loss to North Korea. On 21 January 2016, she scored her first goal in a 5–0 win over Vietnam in the 2016 Four Nations Tournament. In 2017, Lee was named KFA Footballer of the Year.

Career statistics

International
.

Scores and results list South Korea's goal tally first, score column indicates score after each Lee goal.

Honours

Club
Incheon Hyundai Steel Red Angels
WK League: 2013, 2014, 2015, 2016, 2017, 2020, 2021, 2022

Individual
KFA Footballer of the Year: 2017

References

External links
 
 
 
 Lee Min-a at INAC Kobe Leonessa
 Lee Min-a at WK League

1991 births
Living people
Sportspeople from Daegu
South Korean women's footballers
Women's association football midfielders
South Korea women's under-17 international footballers
South Korea women's under-20 international footballers
South Korea women's international footballers
Footballers at the 2018 Asian Games
Asian Games bronze medalists for South Korea
Asian Games medalists in football
Medalists at the 2018 Asian Games
Incheon Hyundai Steel Red Angels WFC players
INAC Kobe Leonessa players
WK League players
Nadeshiko League players
South Korean expatriate footballers
Expatriate women's footballers in Japan
South Korean expatriate sportspeople in Japan
2019 FIFA Women's World Cup players